Jim Lenihan (born 16 May 1973) is an Australian professional rugby league coach who is the assistant coach for the Gold Coast Titans in the NRL and a former professional rugby league footballer.

A  or er, he played for the Gold Coast Seagulls and St George Dragons in the ARL and NRL, and the Huddersfield Giants in the Super League. As head coach of the Burleigh Bears, he won two Queensland Cup premierships (2016 and 2019).

Playing career
Born and raised in Ipswich, Queensland, Lenihan started his career with the Ipswich Jets, playing for the club from 1991 to 1994. In 1995, he joined the Gold Coast Seagulls and made his first grade debut in round 7 of the 1995 ARL season, scoring a try in a 16–28 loss to the Eastern Suburbs. 

In 1996, after playing six games for the Gold Coast, he joined St. George. In three seasons with St. George, he played 40 games, scoring nine tries and was a regular in the side during the 1997 and 1998 seasons.  Lenihan played in St. George's final game before they formed a joint venture with the Illawarra Steelers to become St. George Illawarra.  A semi-final loss to Canterbury-Bankstown at Kogarah Oval.

In 1999, he joined the Huddersfield Giants in the Super League. He spent one season at the club, playing 21 games and scoring 12 tries. In 2000, he returned to Australia, joining the Burleigh Bears, playing three seasons at the club.

Coaching career
From 2004-2005, Lenihan was the assistant coach of the Burleigh Bears' FOGS Colts side.

In 2006, Lenihan was appointed as head coach of the Bears' Queensland Cup side, replacing Rick Stone, who eventually joined the Newcastle Knights as an assistant coach. After making three straight Grand Finals under Stone, the Bears missed the finals for four straight seasons under Lenihan, with sixth being their highest finish. He resigned from the club at end of the 2009 season.

In 2011, after a year away from coaching, Lenihan joined the Bilambil Jets, winning the Bycroft Cup in his first season at the club. In December 2013, he rejoined Burleigh as an assistant coach after three seasons with Bilambil.

In May 2014, Lenihan became head coach of the Bears for the second time, replacing Carl Briggs. In 2016, the Bears won the Queensland Cup Grand Final, defeating the Redcliffe Dolphins 26–16 at Suncorp Stadium. In 2019, Lenihan won his second Queensland Cup Grand Final with the Bears, defeating the Wynnum Manly Seagulls 28–10 at Dolphin Stadium.

On 8 October 2019, he joined the Gold Coast Titans as an assistant coach on a three-year deal.

References

1973 births
Living people
Australian rugby league coaches
Australian rugby league players
Burleigh Bears coaches
Gold Coast Chargers players
Huddersfield Giants players
Ipswich Jets players
Rugby league centres
Rugby league players from Ipswich, Queensland
Rugby league wingers
St. George Dragons players